David Paquet is a Canadian playwright, who won the Governor General's Award for French-language drama at the 2010 Governor General's Awards, and the Prix Michel-Tremblay, for his play Porc-épic.

His other plays have included 2h14, Appels entrants illimités, Le brasier and Papiers mâchés.

He is a graduate of the National Theatre School of Canada.

He won a second Governor General's Award for drama at the 2022 Governor General's Awards for Le poids des fourmis.

References

21st-century Canadian dramatists and playwrights
Canadian male dramatists and playwrights
Canadian dramatists and playwrights in French
Writers from Quebec
Living people
Governor General's Award-winning dramatists
1978 births
21st-century Canadian male writers
French Quebecers